The 1988 Summer Olympics, officially known as the Games of the XXIV Olympiad and commonly known as Seoul 1988, was an international multi-sport event held from 17 September to 2 October 1988 in Seoul, South Korea. 159 nations were represented at the games by a total of 8,391 athletes (6,197 men and 2,194 women). 237 events were held and 27,221 volunteers helped to prepare the Olympics.

The 1988 Seoul Olympics were the second summer Olympic Games held in Asia and the first held in South Korea. As the host country, South Korea ranked fourth overall, winning 12 gold medals and 33 medals in the competition. 11,331 media (4,978 written press and 6,353 broadcasters) showed the Games all over the world. These were the last Olympic Games of the Cold War, as well as for the Soviet Union and East Germany, as both ceased to exist before the next Olympic Games in 1992. The Soviet Union dominated the medal count, winning 55 gold and 132 total medals. The results that got closest to that medal haul in the years since are China's 48 gold medals in 2008 and the USA's 121 total medals in 2016.

Compared to the 1980 Summer Olympics (Moscow) and the 1984 Summer Olympics (Los Angeles), which were divided into two camps by ideology, the 1988 Seoul Olympics was a competition in which the boycotts virtually disappeared, although they were not completely over. North Korea boycotted the 1988 Seoul Olympics, as well as five socialist countries including Cuba, an ally of North Korea. Albania, Ethiopia, and Seychelles did not respond to the invitation sent by the IOC. Nicaragua did not participate due to athletic and financial considerations, while the expected participation of Madagascar was withdrawn for financial reasons. Nonetheless, the much larger boycotts seen in the three previous editions were avoided, resulting in the largest number of participating nations during the Cold War era, and thus regarded as the Olympics that laid the groundwork for the end of the Cold War.

For South Korea, the 1988 Olympics was a symbolic event that elevated its international image while also contributing to national pride. Only thirty-five years after the Korean War which devastated the nation, and during a decade of social unrest in South Korea, the Olympics was successfully held and became the culmination of what was deemed the "Miracle on the Han River".

Host city selection
Seoul was chosen to host the Summer Games through a vote held on 30 September 1981, finishing ahead of Nagoya, Japan. The awarding to Seoul was internationally considered to be surprising, with Nagoya having been considered a favourite. Below was the vote count that occurred at the 84th IOC Session and 11th Olympic Congress in Baden-Baden, West Germany.

Seoul had previously hosted many international sporting events, but the most noteworthy ones were the Miss Universe 1980 and the 1986 Asian Games, thus demonstrating it could host big events and give the right direction to the city.

Highlights

 Soviet Vladimir Artemov won four gold medals in gymnastics. Daniela Silivaş of Romania won three and equalled compatriot Nadia Comăneci's record of seven perfect 10s in one Olympic Games.
 After having demolished the world record in the 100-metre dash at the US Olympic trials in Indianapolis, sprinter Florence Griffith Joyner set an Olympic record (10.62) in the 100-metre dash and a still-standing world record (21.34) in the 200-metre dash to capture gold medals in both events. To these medals, she added a gold in the 4×100 relay and a silver in the 4×400.
 This was the first Olympic Games where women's sailing was its own event. It was won by Americans Allison Jolly and Lynne Jewell.
 Canadian Ben Johnson won the 100-metre final with a world-record time of 9.79 seconds, but was disqualified after he tested positive for stanozolol. Johnson has since claimed that his positive test was the result of sabotage.
 In the women's artistic gymnastics team all-around competition, the United States women's team was penalized five-tenths of a point from their team score by the Fédération Internationale de Gymnastique (FIG) after the compulsory round. East German judge Ellen Berger noticed that Rhonda Faehn, who was the American team alternate and not competing, had been standing on the uneven bars podium for the duration of Kelly Garrison-Steve's compulsory uneven bars routine. Although Faehn was not a coach, Berger assessed the penalty under a rule prohibiting coaches from remaining on the podium while an athlete competes. The deduction caused the United States to fall to fourth place with a combined score of 390.575, three-tenths of a point behind East Germany. This incident remains controversial in the sport of gymnastics, as the United States outperformed the East German team and would have taken the bronze medal in the team competition had they not been penalized.
 Phoebe Mills won an individual bronze medal on the balance beam, shared with Romania's Gabriela Potorac, making history as the first medal (team or individual) ever won by a US woman in artistic gymnastics at a fully attended games.
The USSR won their final team gold medals in artistic gymnastics on both the men's and women's sides with scores of 593.350 and 395.475 respectively. The men's team was led by Vladimir Artemov, while Elena Shushunova led the women's team.
 Lawrence Lemieux, a Canadian sailor in the Finn class, was in second place and poised to win a silver medal when he abandoned the race to save an injured competitor in mortal peril. He finished in 21st place, but was recognized by the IOC with the Pierre de Coubertin medal honoring his bravery and sacrifice.
 American diver Greg Louganis won back-to-back titles on both diving events despite striking his head on the springboard during his third-round dive and suffering a concussion.
 Christa Luding-Rothenburger of East Germany won the silver medal in the women's sprint event in cycling. Combined with the two medals she won in speed skating in the Winter Games in Calgary, she became the first athlete to win medals in two Olympics held in the same year; this feat is no longer possible due to the current scheduling of the Olympic Games.
 Anthony Nesty of Suriname won his country's first Olympic medal by winning the men's 100-metre butterfly, prevailing over American Matt Biondi by .01 of a second (thwarting Biondi's attempt to match Mark Spitz's record seven golds in one Olympics). Nesty was the first black person to win an individual swimming gold.
 Swimmer Kristin Otto of East Germany won six gold medals. Other multi-gold medalists in the pool were Matt Biondi (five) and Janet Evans (three).
 Swedish fencer Kerstin Palm became the first woman to take part in seven Olympics.
 Mark Todd of New Zealand won his second consecutive individual gold medal in the three-day event in equestrian on Charisma, only the second time in eventing history that a gold medal has been won consecutively.
 Baseball and Taekwondo were demonstration sports. The opening ceremony featured a mass demonstration of taekwondo with hundreds of adults and children performing moves in unison.
 This was the last time the United States was represented by an all-amateur basketball team that did not feature NBA players; the team won the bronze medal after losing to the Soviet Union (that was represented by veteran professionals) which went on to win the gold medal.
 For the first time in history, all the dressage events were won by women.
 Women's judo was held for the first time, as a demonstration sport.
 Bowling was held as a demonstration sport, with Kwon Jong Yul of South Korea and Arianne Cerdeña from the Philippines winning the men's and women's gold medals, respectively.
 Table tennis was introduced at the Olympics, with China and South Korea both winning two titles.
 Tennis returned to the Olympics after a 64-year absence. Steffi Graf added to her four Grand Slam victories in the year by also winning the Olympic title, beating Sabatini in the final.
 Two Bulgarian weightlifters were stripped of their gold medals after failing doping tests, and the team withdrew after this event.
 In boxing, Roy Jones Jr. of the United States dominated his opponents, never losing a single round en route to the final. In the final, he controversially lost a 3–2 decision to South Korean fighter Park Si-Hun despite pummeling Park for three rounds and landing 86 punches to Park's 32.
 In another boxing controversy, Riddick Bowe of the United States lost a controversial match in the final to Canadian future world heavyweight champion Lennox Lewis. Bowe had a dominant first round, landing 33 of 94 punches thrown (34%) while Lewis landed 14 of 67 (21%). In the first round the referee from East Germany gave Bowe two cautions for headbutts and deducted a point for a third headbutt, although replay clearly showed there was none. Commentator Ferdie Pacheco disagreed with the deduction, saying they did not hit heads. In the second round, Lewis landed several hard punches. The referee gave Bowe two standing eight counts and waved the fight off after the second one, even though Bowe seemed able to continue. Pacheco disagreed with the stoppage, calling it "very strange".
 Soviet weightlifter Yury Zakharevich won the men's heavyweight (up to 110 kg class) with a  snatch and  clean and jerk for a  total. Zakhareivich had dislocated his elbow in 1983 attempting a world record and had it rebuilt with synthetic tendons.
 Indonesia gained its first medal in Olympic history when the women's team won a silver medal in archery.

Ceremonies
Live doves were released during the opening ceremony as a symbol of world peace, but a number of the doves were burned alive or suffered major trauma by the lighting of the Olympic cauldron. As a result of protests following the incident, the last time live doves were released at the opening ceremony was in 1992 in Barcelona, hours before the cauldron was lit. Balloon doves were released in 1994 Winter Olympics and the 1998 Winter Olympics and paper doves were used at the Atlanta Ceremony in 1996.

These were also the last Summer Olympic Games to hold the opening ceremony during the daytime. The opening ceremony featured a skydiving team descending over the stadium and forming the five-colored Olympic Rings, as well as a mass demonstration of taekwondo. The skydiving team trained at SkyDance SkyDiving and had hoped the opening ceremony appearance would set the stage for skydiving becoming a medal event by 2000.

Domestic historical significance

The idea for South Korea to place a bid for the 1988 Games emerged during the last days of the Park Chung-hee administration in the late 1970s, as hosting the Olympics was a big opportunity to bring international attention to South Korea. But before that, it was necessary to prove the country's capacity, as South Korea was seen as an exotic and risky destination for large events. The project continued to run even after President Park's assassination in 1979. 
With the successful staging of Miss Universe 1980 and the 1986 Asian Games, Chun Doo-hwan, Park's successor, submitted Korea's bid to the IOC in September 1981, in hopes that the increased international exposure brought by the Olympics would legitimize his authoritarian regime amidst increasing political pressure for democratization and less rigidity in state policies. Further, he hoped it would provide protection from increasing threats from North Korea, and showcase the economic strength that the country was experiencing to the world. Seoul was awarded the bid on 30 September 1981, becoming the 16th nation in the Summer Olympics, as well as the second Asian nation (following Japan in the 1964 Summer Olympics) and the first mainland Asian nation to host the Olympics.

Influenced by the model of 1964 Tokyo Olympics as a rite of passage for the Japanese economy and re-integration of Japan in the international community in the post-war era, the South Korean government hoped to use the Olympics as a "coming-out party". The Olympics gave a powerful impetus to the development of South Korea's relations with Eastern Europe, the Soviet Union and with China. In January 1982, South Korea's curfew that had been in place since 1945 was lifted.

In utilizing media events theory, Larson and Park investigated the Seoul Olympics as a form of political communication. They revealed the significance of South Korea's military government throughout the period of the Olympic bid and preparation, followed by the many advantages of the hosting the Games: rapid economic modernization, social mobilization and the legitimization of the military dictatorship.

Homeless camp expansion
Existing camps for "vagrants" (homeless persons) were ramped up before the 1988 Olympics. An Associated Press article states that homeless and alcoholic persons, "but mostly children and the disabled" were arrested and sent to these camps to prepare for the Olympics. In addition, a prosecutor had his investigation into the Brothers Home camp limited at a number of levels of government "in part out of fear of an embarrassing international incident on the eve of the Olympics."

In 1975, the previous president of South Korea had begun a policy of rounding up vagrants. According to government documents obtained by the Associated Press, from 1981 to 1986 the number of people held increased from 8,600 to more than 16,000. Police officers often received promotions based on the number of vagrants they had arrested, and owners of facilities received a subsidy based on the number of people held. There were multiple reports of inmates raped or beaten, and sometimes beaten to death.

4,000 of these "vagrants" were held at the Brothers Home facility. Many of the guards were former inmates who had been "promoted" because of loyalty to the camp's owner. Various money-making operations were conducted such as manufacturing ball-point pens and fishing hooks, as well as clothing for Daewoo. Only a few inmates were paid belatedly for this work.

By accident while on a hunting trip, prosecutor Kim Yong-won heard about and visited a work detail of prisoners in ragged clothes overseen by guards with wooden bats and dogs. In his words, he knew immediately that "a very serious crime" was occurring, and in January 1987, he led a raid on the facility and found beaten and malnourished inmates. He was politically pressured at various levels to reduce the charges against the owner, managers, and guards. In the end, the owner only served two-and-a-half years in prison.

The Brothers Home was a religious facility based on the Christian faith. There were in fact inspections by both city officials and church officials. However, these were scheduled inspections in which healthier inmates were presented in carefully planned and orchestrated circumstances. There were no unannounced inspections.

In the 1990s, construction workers found about 100 human bones on a mountainside outside the location of the former Brothers Home. Victims of the Brothers Home are seeking a government investigation into the crimes committed and accountability.

Boycott

In preparation for the 1988 Olympics, the International Olympic Committee worked to prevent another Olympic boycott by the Eastern Bloc as had happened at the 1984 Summer Olympics in Los Angeles. This was made more difficult by the lack of diplomatic relations between South Korea and communist countries. This prompted action by the IOC president Juan Antonio Samaranch, who was committed to the participation of these countries. Thus, at the Assembly of National Olympic Committees in Mexico City in November 1984, the "Mexico Declaration"  was adopted. The declaration offered support for participation in the 1988 Olympics by all members of the Association of National Olympic Committees. The agreement with the Soviet Union was reached in 1987. After the Los Angeles games, East Germany had already decided to participate again in Seoul. The IOC also decided that it would send invitations to the 1988 Games itself and did not leave this task to the organizing committee as had been done before. Despite these developments, behind the scenes, the IOC did consider relocating the Games and explored the suitability of Munich as an alternative.

Another point of conflict was the involvement of North Korea in hosting the Games, something that had been encouraged by Cuban president Fidel Castro, who called for North Korea to be considered joint host of the Games. As a result, on 8 and 9 January 1986 in Lausanne, Switzerland, the IOC President chaired a meeting of the North and South Korean Olympic Committees. North Korea demanded that eleven of the 23 Olympic sports be carried out on its territory, and also demanded special opening and closing ceremonies. It wanted a joint organizing committee and a united team. The negotiations were continued into another meeting, but were not successful. The IOC did not meet the demands of North Korea and only about half of the desired sporting events were offered to the North. So the focus thereafter was solely on Seoul and South Korea.

The games were boycotted by North Korea and its ally Cuba. Ethiopia, Albania and the Seychelles did not respond to the invitations sent by the IOC. Nicaragua did not participate due to athletic and financial considerations. Madagascar had been expected to participate before withdrawing for financial reasons.

Official theme song

In 1988, the Seoul Olympic Organizing Committee (SLOOC) produced and distributed an official song of the Seoul Games to publicize the Games to all the IOC member nations, encouraging their participation in the festival and
consolidating the harmony and friendship of the entire world citizens through the song. The song "Hand in Hand" was written by Italian composer Giorgio Moroder and American songwriter Tom Whitlock, and performed by singing group Koreana.

Venues

Seoul Sports Complex venues
Seoul Olympic Stadium – opening/closing ceremonies, athletics, equestrian (jumping individual final), football (final)
Jamsil Indoor Swimming Pool – diving, modern pentathlon (swimming), synchronized swimming, swimming, water polo
Jamsil Gymnasium – basketball, volleyball (final)
Jamsil Students' Gymnasium – boxing
Jamsil Baseball Stadium – baseball (demonstration)
Olympic Park venues
Olympic Velodrome – cycling (track)
Olympic Weightlifting Gymnasium – weightlifting
Olympic Fencing Gymnasium – fencing, modern pentathlon (fencing)
Olympic Gymnastics Hall – gymnastics
Olympic Tennis Center – tennis
Mongchon Tosong – modern pentathlon (running)
Other venues in metropolitan Seoul
Seoul Equestrian Park– equestrian (all but jumping individual final), modern pentathlon (riding)
Han River Regatta Course/Canoeing Site Course – canoeing, rowing
Saemaul Sports Hall – volleyball preliminaries
Hanyang University Gymnasium – volleyball preliminaries
Changchung Gymnasium – judo, taekwondo (demonstration)
Seoul National University Gymnasium – badminton (demonstration), table tennis
Royal Bowling Center – bowling (demonstration)
Dongdaemun Stadium – football preliminaries
Hwarang Archery Field, Nowon-gu – archery
Taenung International Shooting Range, Taenung – modern pentathlon (shooting), shooting
Streets of Seoul – athletics (20 km/ 50 km walk, marathon)
Jangchung Gymnasium – taekwondo (demonstration), judo
Venues outside Seoul
Sangmu Gymnasium, Seongnam – wrestling
Daejeon Stadium, Daejeon – football preliminaries
Daegu Stadium, Daegu – football preliminaries
Busan Stadium, Busan – football preliminaries
Gwangju Stadium, Gwangju – football preliminaries
Suwon Gymnasium, Suwon – handball
Seongnam Stadium, Seongnam – field hockey
Busan Yachting Center, Busan – sailing
Tongillo Road Course – cycling (individual road race, road team time trial)

 Existing facilities modified or refurbished in preparation for the Olympic Games.
 New facilities constructed in preparation for the Olympic Games.

Cost
According to The Oxford Olympics Study data is not available to establish the cost of the Seoul 1988 Summer Olympics.

Sports
The 1988 Summer Olympics featured 23 different sports encompassing 31 disciplines, and medals were awarded in 237 events. In the list below, the number of events in each discipline is noted in parentheses.

Aquatics

Road (3)
Track (6)

Dressage (2)
Eventing (2)
Show jumping (2)

Artistic (14)
Rhythmic (1)

Freestyle (10)
Greco-Roman (10)

Demonstration
These were the demonstration sports in the games:
 
 
 
 Women's

Calendar
All times are local KDT (UTC+10)

Participating National Olympic Committees

Athletes from 159 nations competed at the Seoul Games. Aruba, American Samoa, Brunei, Cook Islands, Maldives, Vanuatu, Saint Vincent and the Grenadines, and South Yemen made their first Olympic appearance at these Games. Guam made their first Summer Olympic appearance at these games having participated in the 1988 Winter Olympics in Calgary.

In the following list, the number in parentheses indicates the number of athletes from each nation that competed in Seoul:

 When the team from the Dominican Republic marched in during the Parade of Nations, the superimposed map erroneously showed the location of Cuba, a nation that did not take part at the Games.

Medal count

These are the top ten nations that won medals at the 1988 Games.

 Host nation (South Korea)

Mascot

The official mascot for the 1988 Summer Olympic Games was Hodori. It was a stylized tiger designed by Kim Hyun as an amicable Amur tiger, portraying the friendly and hospitable traditions of the Korean people. Hodori's female version was called Hosuni.

The name  Hodori was chosen from 2,295 suggestions sent in by the public. It is a compound of  ho, the Sino-Korean bound morpheme for "tiger" (appearing also in the usual word  horangi for "tiger"), and  dori, a diminutive for "boys".

Broadcasting
In the United States, NBC became the telecast provider hereafter for the Summer Games, after a five-Olympics run by American Broadcasting Company from 1968 to 1984.

Doping

In 2003, Wade Exum, the United States Olympic Committee's director of drug control administration from 1991 to 2000, released documents that showed Carl Lewis had tested positive three times at the 1988 United States Olympic trials for minimum amounts of pseudoephedrine, ephedrine, and phenylpropanolamine, which were banned stimulants. Bronchodilators are also found in cold medication. Due to the rules, his case could have led to disqualification from the Seoul Olympics and suspension from competition for six months. The levels of the combined stimulants registered in the separate tests were 2 ppm, 4 ppm and 6 ppm. Lewis defended himself, claiming that he had accidentally consumed the banned substances. After the supplements that he had taken were analyzed to prove his claims, the USOC accepted his claim of inadvertent use, since a dietary supplement he ingested was found to contain "Ma huang", the Chinese name for Ephedra (ephedrine is known to help weight loss). Fellow Santa Monica Track Club teammates Joe DeLoach and Floyd Heard were also found to have the same banned stimulants in their systems, and were cleared to compete for the same reason. The highest level of the stimulants Lewis recorded was 6 ppm, which was regarded as a positive test in 1988 but is now regarded as negative test. The acceptable level has been raised to ten parts per million for ephedrine and twenty-five parts per million for other substances. According to the IOC rules at the time, positive tests with levels lower than 10 ppm were cause of further investigation but not immediate ban. Neal Benowitz, a professor of medicine at UC San Francisco who is an expert on ephedrine and other stimulants, agreed that "These [levels] are what you'd see from someone taking cold or allergy medicines and are unlikely to have any effect on performance." Following Exum's revelations the IAAF acknowledged that at the 1988 Olympic Trials the USOC indeed followed the correct procedures in dealing with eight positive findings for ephedrine and ephedrine-related compounds in low concentration. Additionally, in 1988 the federation reviewed the relevant documents with the athletes' names undisclosed and stated that "the medical committee felt satisfied, however, on the basis of the information received that the cases had been properly concluded by the USOC as 'negative cases' in accordance with the rules and regulations in place at the time and no further action was taken".

See also

1988 Summer Olympics Album: One Moment in Time
Use of performance-enhancing drugs in the Olympic Games – 1988 Seoul

Notes

External links

 88 Seoul Olympics, Seoul Olympics memorial hall
 
 Official Report Vol. 1
 Official Report Vol. 2
 17 September 1988 Newsdesk broadcasting
 2 October 1988 Newsdesk broadcasting
 The program of the 1988 Seoul Olympics
 

 
Olympics
Sports competitions in Seoul
Olympic Games in South Korea
Olympic Games
Summer Olympics by year
1980s in Seoul
International sports boycotts
September 1988 sports events in Asia
October 1988 sports events in Asia